The 2006 Holiday Cup is the eighth edition of the women's water polo competition, held in Los Alamitos, United States. The tournament took place from 6  to 10 December 2006.

Preliminary round
5 December 2006

6 December 2006

7 December 2006

8 December 2006

9 December 2006

Standings

Final round

5th / 6th-place match
10 December 2006

Bronze-medal match
10 December 2006

Gold-medal match
10 December 2006

Final ranking

External links
USA Waterpolo.org

References

Holiday Cup
Holiday Cup
H
H